The 2015–16 Loyola Greyhounds women's basketball team represented Loyola University Maryland during the 2015–16 NCAA Division I women's basketball season. The Greyhounds, led by tenth year head coach Joe Logan, played their home games at Reitz Arena and were members of the Patriot League. They finished the season 16–16, 11–7 in Patriot League play to finish in third place. They advanced to the championship game of the Patriot League women's tournament where they lost to Army.

Roster

Schedule

|-
!colspan=9 style="background:#00563F; color:#DBD9D1;"| Non-conference regular season

|-
!colspan=9 style="background:#00563F; color:#DBD9D1;"| Patriot League regular season

|-
!colspan=9 style="background:#00563F; color:#DBD9D1;"| Patriot League Women's Tournament

See also
 2015–16 Loyola Greyhounds men's basketball team

References

Loyola
Loyola Greyhounds women's basketball seasons